In the 1973–74 season West Ham United played in the First Division for the sixteenth consecutive season.

Season summary
They made a poor start to the season, failing to win any of their first eleven League matches, and were bottom of the table at Christmas after losing at home to Stoke City. However, they rallied in the second half of the season and a draw with Liverpool in their last fixture left them in 18th place, just one point ahead of relegated Southampton.

West Ham were knocked out of the FA Cup in a third round replay by Third Division Hereford United. Hereford's team included Dudley Tyler, who had re-signed for them after leaving West Ham earlier in the season. West Ham had been within two minutes of defeat at home, before a solo goal by Pat Holland took the tie to a replay at Edgar Street, where Hereford came from behind to win 2–1.

West Ham's captain Bobby Moore, who had been dropped the previous autumn, played his last match for the first team in the first FA Cup match against Hereford before moving to Fulham. The 1973–74 season was also Ron Greenwood's last full season as West Ham's manager.

League table

Results

Football League First Division

FA Cup

League Cup

Players

References

1973-74
English football clubs 1973–74 season
1973 sports events in London
1974 sports events in London